Mahoning Creek may refer to the following creeks in the U.S. state of Pennsylvania:

Mahoning Creek (Allegheny River), a tributary of the Allegheny River
Mahoning Creek (Lehigh River), a tributary of the Lehigh River in Lehigh County
Mahoning Creek (Susquehanna River), a tributary of the Susquehanna River in Montour County

See also
Mahoning River, in Ohio and Pennsylvania